Riccardo Corallo is a retired Italian footballer. He played as a defender.

References

External links
 Profile at lega-calcio.it
 
 
 

Living people
1980 births
Italian footballers
S.S.D. Varese Calcio players
F.C. Pro Vercelli 1892 players
S.S. Lazio players
A.C. Reggiana 1919 players
U.S. Avellino 1912 players
A.C.R. Messina players
S.P.A.L. players
Ascoli Calcio 1898 F.C. players
U.S. Cremonese players
ACF Gloria Bistrița players
U.S. Viterbese 1908 players
A.C. Montichiari players
Serie A players
Serie B players
Serie C players
Serie D players
Liga I players
Association football midfielders
Expatriate footballers in Romania
Italian expatriate sportspeople in Romania